Grand View Hotel may refer to:

Grand View Hotel, in Cleveland, Queensland
Elk Mountain Hotel in Elk Mountain, Wyoming, listed on the National Register of Historic Places in Carbon County, Wyoming and at one time known as Grandview Hotel